James Wilson II (March 18, 1797 – May 29, 1881) was a U.S. Representative from New Hampshire, son of James Wilson (1766–1839).

Life

Born in Peterborough, New Hampshire, James Wilson II attended New Ipswich Academy and the academies at Atkinson and Exeter.  He moved with his parents to Keene, New Hampshire, in 1815, and graduated from Middlebury College in Vermont in 1820.

Wilson served as member of the New Hampshire State militia 1820-1840 and was successively promoted from captain to major general. A law student, he was admitted to the bar in 1823 and commenced practice in Keene. He served as member of the New Hampshire House of Representatives 1825-1837, 1840, and 1846, and served as Speaker in 1828. He was an unsuccessful candidate for governor in 1835 and 1838. He served as delegate to the Whig National Convention in 1840 and was Surveyor general of public lands in the Territories of Wisconsin and Iowa 1841-1845.

He and his wife, Mary Low Wilson ( Richardson), had seven children. Their eldest daughter was Mary Elizabeth Sherwood.

Wilson was elected as a Whig to the Thirtieth and Thirty-first Congresses and served from March 4, 1847, to September 9, 1850, when he resigned. He served as chairman of the Committee on Expenditures in the Post Office Department (Thirtieth Congress). He was appointed one of the land claim commissioners for California in 1851 and served in this capacity until 1853. He settled in San Francisco and remained there until 1867, when he returned to Keene, New Hampshire. He was again a member of the New Hampshire House of Representatives in 1871 and 1872.

He died in Keene, New Hampshire on May 29, 1881, aged 84, and was interred in Woodland Cemetery.

References 
 

1797 births
1881 deaths
People from Peterborough, New Hampshire
New Hampshire lawyers
New Hampshire Whigs
Members of the New Hampshire House of Representatives
Members of the United States House of Representatives from New Hampshire
Speakers of the New Hampshire House of Representatives
Middlebury College alumni
American militia generals
Whig Party members of the United States House of Representatives
19th-century American politicians
19th-century American lawyers